Nathan Sheafor (born November 16, 1961) is an American former cyclist. Sheafor won the 1989 United States National Time Trial Championships. He also competed in the team time trial at the 1992 Summer Olympics.

References

External links
 

1961 births
Living people
American male cyclists
Olympic cyclists of the United States
Cyclists at the 1992 Summer Olympics
People from Fort Bragg, North Carolina
Sportspeople from North Carolina
20th-century American people